Saint Cecilia is a 1627–1628 painting by Nicolas Poussin, now in the Prado Museum in Madrid. It shows saint Cecilia playing a keyboard instrument, possibly a harpsichord. Two cherubs in front of her hold up a scroll with a musical score, whilst two angels sing in the background and a third cherub lifts a curtain.

References

1628 paintings
Paintings of the Museo del Prado by French artists
Paintings by Nicolas Poussin
Poussin